Luca Homonnai (born 11 October 1998) is a Hungarian sprint canoer. She won a silver medal at the 2015 ICF Canoe Sprint World Championships with Natasa Dusev-Janics in K–2 200 m.

Homonnai also won silver medal at the 2014 Summer Youth Olympics in the head to head sprint kayak one event.

References

1998 births
Living people
Hungarian female canoeists
ICF Canoe Sprint World Championships medalists in kayak
People from Orosháza
Canoeists at the 2014 Summer Youth Olympics
Sportspeople from Békés County
21st-century Hungarian women